Jenkinshelea is a genus of biting midges in the family Ceratopogonidae. There are about 18 described species in Jenkinshelea.

Species
These 18 species belong to the genus Jenkinshelea:

 Jenkinshelea accraensis (Ingram & Macfie, 1923)
 Jenkinshelea albaria (Coquillett, 1895)
 Jenkinshelea blantoni Grogan & Wirth, 1977
 Jenkinshelea corea Meillon, 1942
 Jenkinshelea distincta Meillon & Wirth, 1983
 Jenkinshelea djalonensis Clastrier, 1983
 Jenkinshelea magnipennis (Johannsen, 1908)
 Jenkinshelea niphanae Grogan & Wirth, 1981
 Jenkinshelea papuae Tokunaga, 1966
 Jenkinshelea polyxenae Meillon, 1936
 Jenkinshelea rhodesiensis Meillon, 1937
 Jenkinshelea setosiforceps Grogan & Wirth, 1981
 Jenkinshelea setosipennis Kieffer
 Jenkinshelea stenoptera Remm, 1979
 Jenkinshelea stonei Grogan & Wirth, 1977
 Jenkinshelea sudwalai Meillon & Wirth, 1983
 Jenkinshelea tokunagai Grogan & Wirth, 1981
 Jenkinshelea trisensillata Clastrier, 1983

References

Further reading

External links

 

Ceratopogonidae
Articles created by Qbugbot
Chironomoidea genera